Aļona Ribakova (born  7 February 1991) is a Latvian breaststroke swimmer. She represented her country at the 2016 Summer Olympics.

References

External links
 

1991 births
Living people
Sportspeople from Riga
Latvian female breaststroke swimmers
Swimmers at the 2016 Summer Olympics
Olympic swimmers of Latvia
Competitors at the 2013 Summer Universiade
Competitors at the 2015 Summer Universiade